WKUM (1470 AM) is a radio station broadcasting a Spanish variety format. Licensed to Orocovis, Puerto Rico, it serves the Puerto Rico area. The station was founded in 1979 and is currently owned by Cumbre Media Group Corp and features programming from Red Informativa de PR.

History

WKUM was founded on October 15, 1979 by Luis Rodríguez Bou. Formerly "WKCK Radio Cumbre" ("cumbre" is "summit" in Spanish language). After the death of Rodríguez Bou his son, Dr. Luis Rodríguez Gotay, assumes control of the station and changes its format from music-top 40 to news-talk.

Translator stations

References

External links

 

KUM
Radio stations established in 1979
1979 establishments in Puerto Rico
Orocovis, Puerto Rico